"Vanished" is a single by Crystal Castles. It was released on Play It Again Sam Records on July 21, 2008, despite the fact that the release was supposed to be cancelled. The band did not want to release the song as a single and did not approve of the track listing or the artwork. "Tell Me What to Swallow" beat demo was a rejected remix by a French producer, not produced by Ethan Kath, but somehow the song appeared on the release. The vocals are sampled from the track "Sex City" from Van She.

Reception
"Vanished" were received positively by critics, being described by NME as "just sensational, a weightless, sleekly designed electro-disco anthem".

Track listing

Digital download

7": Play It Again Sam UK

References

2008 singles
Crystal Castles (band) songs
Songs written by Ethan Kath
2008 songs